Surcouf may refer to:


People 
 Édouard Surcouf (1862–1938), French engineer, dirigible designer and pilot, and industrialist
 Jacques Surcouf (1873–1934), French entomologist
 Marie Surcouf (1863–1928), French balloonist and feminist
 Nicolas Surcouf (1770–1848), French privateer and shipowner, brother of Robert Surcouf
 Robert Surcouf (1773–1827), French privateer, slave trader and shipowner

Ships 
 French ship Surcouf, five ships named after Robert Surcouf

Works about Robert Surcouf 
 Surcouf (film), a 1924 French silent film serial
 Surcouf (opéra comique), an 1887 French opéra comique
 The Sea Pirate, original title Surcouf, le tigre des sept mers, a 1966 French-Italian-Spanish adventure film

See also
 
 
 Robert Surcouf de Maisonneuve (1671–c. 1720), French privateer, an ancestor of Robert Surcouf